Jorge Kissling (March 10, 1940 – April 28, 1968) was a former Grand Prix motorcycle road racer from Argentina. He won in his first Grand Prix race at the 1961 500cc Argentine Grand Prix. He ended the season ranked seventh overall.

He died during a touring car race in Buenos Aires.

References 

1940 births
Argentine motorcycle racers
Argentine racing drivers
125cc World Championship riders
250cc World Championship riders
500cc World Championship riders
Racing drivers who died while racing
Argentine people of German descent
1968 deaths
Sport deaths in Argentina